Patrick Gervase Edwards (born 21 October 1965) is an English former first-class cricketer.

Edwards was born at Bradford-on-Avon in October 1965. He later studied at Christ Church, Oxford where he played first-class cricket for Oxford University. He made his debut against Kent at Oxford in 1987. He played first-class cricket for Oxford until 1989, making a total of nineteen appearances. Playing as a slow left-arm orthodox bowler, he took 40 wickets at an average of 43.15 and best figures of 4 for 93.

References

External links

1965 births
Living people
People from Bradford-on-Avon
Alumni of Christ Church, Oxford
English cricketers
Oxford University cricketers
English cricketers of 1969 to 2000